Hona Tha Pyar is an Urdu language Pakistani song from the 2011 film Bol by Shoaib Mansoor. It is sung by Atif Aslam and Hadiqa Kiyani. The song was composed and written by Ali javed . It was produced by Shiraz Uppal and pictured on Atif Aslam and Mahira Khan.

Accolades
Hona Tha Pyar was nominated at various awards including Pakistan Media Awards, Lux Style Awards and PTV Awards.

|-
! style="background:#bfd7ff;" colspan="4"|Lux Style Awards
|-
|rowspan="2"|2012
|rowspan="2"|Atif Aslam and Hadiqa Kiani
|Song of the Year
|
|-
|Best Original Sound Track
|
|-
! style="background:#bfd7ff;" colspan="4"|Pakistan Media Awards
|-
|2012
|Atif Aslam and Hadiqa Kiani
|Best Playback Singer
|
|}

References

Urdu-language songs
Songs written for films
2011 songs
Pakistani songs
Atif Aslam songs
Songs written by Atif Aslam